Malawi competed at the 2019 World Athletics Championships in Doha, Qatar from 27 September to 6 October 2019.

Results

Men
Track and road events

References

Malawi
World Championships in Athletics
2019